Gulab Singh is an Indian politician. He was a member of Uttar Pradesh Legislative Assembly for eight terms. He served as a minister during the congressional government.

Singh represented Chakrata (Uttarakhand Assembly constituency) and was a member of the Indian National Congress. His son Pritam Singh served as the president of the Uttarakhand Congress Party and was a four-term member of the Uttarakhand Legislative Assembly (2002-2007 and 2012-2017).

Positions held

Elections

References

External links
 1967 Election S No 122
 1969 Election S No 108
 1974 Election S No 121
 1980 Election S No 115
 1985 Election S No 113
 1989 Election S No 113
 Pritam Singh: Pritam Singh named new chief of Uttarakhand Congress | Dehradun News - Times of India
 The Pioneer

20th-century Indian politicians
Indian National Congress politicians from Uttar Pradesh
Uttar Pradesh MLAs 1957–1962
Uttar Pradesh MLAs 1962–1967
Uttar Pradesh MLAs 1967–1969
Uttar Pradesh MLAs 1969–1974
Uttar Pradesh MLAs 1974–1977
Uttar Pradesh MLAs 1980–1985
Uttar Pradesh MLAs 1985–1989
Uttar Pradesh MLAs 1989–1991